The 2002–03 season saw Millwall compete in the Football League First Division where they finished in 9th position with 66 points.

Final league table

Results
Millwall's score comes first

Legend

Football League First Division

FA Cup

Football League Cup

Players

First-team squad
Squad at end of season

Left club during season

Squad statistics

Notes

References

External links
 Millwall 2002–03 at Soccerbase.com (select relevant season from dropdown list)

2002-03
Millwall